Lina Vasylivna Kostenko (born 19 March 1930) is a Ukrainian poet, journalist, writer, publisher, and former Soviet dissident. A founder and leading representative of the Sixtiers poetry movement, Kostenko has been described as one of Ukraine's foremost poets and credited with reviving Ukrainian-language lyric poetry.

Kostenko has been granted numerous honours, including an honorary professorship at Kyiv Mohyla Academy, honorary doctorates of Lviv and Chernivtsi Universities, and the Shevchenko National Prize, and the Legion of Honour.

Early life and career 

Lina Vasylivna Kostenko was born to a family of teachers in Rzhyshchiv. In 1936, her family moved from Rzhyshchiv to the Ukrainian capital city of Kyiv, where she finished her secondary education.

From 1937 to 1941, she studied at the Kyiv school #100, located on Trukhaniv Island, where her family lived. The school, in addition to the rest of the village, were burned by Nazi forces in 1943. The poem I Grew Up in Kyivan Venice is devoted to these events.

After graduating from high school, she studied at the Kyiv Pedagogical Institute, and later at the Maxim Gorky Literature Institute in Moscow, from where she graduated with distinction in 1956.

Sixtiers movement 
Kostenko was one of the first and most important figures of the Sixtiers movement of the 1950s and 1960s. Her poetry is typically lyrical and sophisticated, but also relies heavily on aphorisms, colloquialisms, and satirical language, and is typically critical of authoritarianism.

Kostenko has been credited with reviving lyric poetry in the Ukrainian language, and has been called one of Ukraine's greatest female poets. Ivan Koshelivets, Ukrainian émigré scholar, referred to her writing as "unprecedented" for its deviation from socialist realism.

In the early 1960s, she took part in the literary evenings of the Kyiv Creative Youth Club. Following her graduation, she published three collections of poetry: Earthly Rays in 1957, Sails in 1958, and Journeys of the Heart in 1961. The poems became immensely popular among Ukrainian readers. However, the government of the Soviet Union forced her into silence as she was unwilling to submit to Soviet authorities who censored her poems.

Conflict with the Soviet government 
In 1961, she was criticised for "apoliticism." In 1963, The Star Integral poetry collection was removed from print, while another collection of poems, The Prince's Mountain, was removed from typography. During these years, Kostenko's poems were published in Czechoslovak magazines and Polish newspapers. However, they only occasionally reached Ukrainian audiences, mostly via samizdat.

In 1965, Kostenko signed a letter of protest against arrests of the Ukrainian intelligentsia. She was present at the trial of Mykhailo Osadchyi and Myroslava Zvarychevska in Lviv. During the trial of the Horyn brothers, she threw them flowers. Together with Ivan Drach, she appealed to the editorial office of the magazine "Zhovten" (now "Dzvin") and to the Lviv writers with a proposal to speak out in defence of the arrested. The writers did not dare to protest, but filed a lawsuit with the request to admit Bohdan Horyn on bail as the youngest of arrested. These efforts did not influence the trials, although they influenced the morale of Ukrainian dissidents at the time.

In May 1966, in the National Writers' Union of Ukraine, where the "nationalist outlaws" were labelled, a part of the youth held the ovation of Kostenko, who defended her position and defended Ivan Svitlichny, Opanas Zalyvaha, Myhajlo Kosiv and Bohdan Horyn. In 1967 Omeljan Pritsak nominated Kostenko and Ivan Drach for the Nobel Prize in Literature along with the older Ukrainian poet and politician Pavlo Tychyna.

In 1968, she wrote letters in defence of Viacheslav Chornovil in response to the defamation against him in the newspaper "Literary Ukraine." After that, the name of Lina Kostenko was not mentioned in the Soviet press for many years. She worked "in the drawer", knowing that her works were not going to be published.

In 1973 Lina Kostenko was blacklisted by Secretary of the Central Committee on Ideology of the Communist Party of Ukraine Valentyn Malanchuk. Only in 1977, after the departure of Malanchuk, was her collection of poems On the Banks of the Eternal River published, and in 1979, under a special decree of the Presidium of the Socialist-Revolutionary Guard, one of her greatest works was published, a historical novel in the verses Marusia Churai (about a 17th-century Ukrainian folk singer) which had stagnated with recognition for 6 years. She was awarded the Taras Shevchenko National Prize of the Ukrainian SSR in 1987.

Kostenko also wrote collections of poems Originality (1980) and Garden of Unthawed Sculptures (1987), a collection of poems for children, titled The Lilac King (1987).

Life in independent Ukraine 
In 1991, Kostenko moved to the Chornobyl Exclusion Zone, saying that she wished to "gain strength," though she cautioned others against doing so. Following the death of her husband  in 2000, she went into a hiatus from writing.

In 2010, Notes of a Ukrainian Madman was released. It was her first novel, and her first book since her 1989 Selected Works. The release of Notes was intended to be followed by a book tour across Ukraine, but abruptly ended in Lviv, allegedly after Kostenko had been offended either by Lviv residents selling tickets to the presentation (which was intended to be free) or by critics who disliked the book.

In 2005, an attempt was made by then-President Viktor Yushchenko to decorate Kostenko as a Hero of Ukraine, the highest reward of the state. However, Kostenko refused the award, declaring, "I will not wear political jewellery."

Amidst the 2022 Russian invasion of Ukraine, Kostenko criticised the usage of obscene language and publicly opposed its legalisation, writing on social media, "There is, perhaps, no other such thing [as the Ukrainian language] in the whole world. The language is a nightingale, while the devil is blabbering on."

Awards and honours 
 Taras Shevchenko National Prize (1987, for the novel "Marusya Churai" and the collection "Uniqueness")
 Antonovych prize (1989)
 Honourary professorship from the National University of Kyiv-Mohyla Academy.
 Honourary doctorates from Lviv and Chernivtsi universities.
 Asteroid 290127 Linakostenko, discovered at the Andrushivka Astronomical Observatory in 2005, was named in her honor. The official  was published by the Minor Planet Centre on 2 June 2015.

Bibliography

List of publications (chronologically) 

 Rays of the Earth (1957)
 "Sails" (1958)
 "Journeys of the Heart" (1961)
 "Knyazha Gora" (1972, the collection was not released due to a ban by Soviet censorship)
 "On the banks of the eternal river" (1977)
 "Marusya Churai" (1979, reprint 1982, 1990, 2018)
 "Uniqueness" (1980)
 "Garden of non-melting sculptures" (1987)
 "Elder King" (1987) - for children
 "The Chosen One" (1987)
 "Incrustations" (1994, edition in Italian, awarded the Petrarch Prize)
 "Berestechko" (Kyiv: Ukrainian writer, 1999, reprint 2007, 2010)
 "Notes of the Ukrainian self-made man" (2010)
 "River of Heraclitus" (2011)
 "Madonna Crossroads" (2011)
 "Three hundred poems. Selected poems" (2012)

Famous works 
 Rays of the Earth (1957)
 Sails (1958)
 Wandering of the Heart (1961)
 On the Shore of the Eternal River (1977)
 Originality (1980)
 Marusia Churai (1979)
 Garden of Unthawed Sculptures (1987)
 The King of the Lilacs (1987)
 Selected Works (1989)
 Notes of a Ukrainian Madman (2010)

References

External links 

 Poems of Kostenko 
 Ukrainian art songs on poetry of Lina Kostenko

Ukrainian women poets
Ukrainian dissidents
1930 births
Living people
People from Rzhyshchiv
Recipients of the Shevchenko National Prize
Soviet dissidents
20th-century Ukrainian poets
Ukrainian women novelists
Ukrainian children's writers
20th-century Ukrainian women writers
21st-century Ukrainian poets
21st-century Ukrainian women writers
Historical novelists
Recipients of the Order of Prince Yaroslav the Wise, 5th class
National Pedagogical Dragomanov University alumni
Maxim Gorky Literature Institute alumni